Each winner of the 1965 Governor General's Awards for Literary Merit was selected by a panel of judges administered by the Canada Council for the Arts.

Winners

English Language
Poetry or Drama: Al Purdy, The Cariboo Horses.
Non-Fiction: James Eayrs, In Defence of Canada.

French Language
Fiction: Gérard Bessette, L'incubation
Poetry or Drama: Gilles Vigneault, Quand les bateaux s'en vont.
Non-Fiction: André S. Vachon, Le temps et l'espace dans l'oeuvre de Paul Claudel.

Governor General's Awards
Governor General's Awards
Governor General's Awards